The Third Council of Dvin was a church council held in 607 (or 609-610) in the city of Dvin (then in Sasanian Armenia). The schism within the Armenian Church which had erupted as a result of the second Chalcedonian Catholicosate in Armenia (591–610), was mended, and the Council of Chalcedon of 451 was explicitly condemned.

The synod saw the election of an Armenian, as Catholicos. Abraham condemned the Council of Chalcedon in accordance  with the decision of the Second Council of Dvin. The Georgian church had however, come to support the position of the Chalcedonian Church on that Council, and this Council established the distinct split between the Armenian and Georgian Churches.

Although a rift was established with the Georgian church the Council led to mending of a rift within the Armenian Church itself.

References

Sources
 
 

Armenian Apostolic Church
7th-century church councils
7th century in Armenia
607
History of Dvin
Christianity in the Sasanian Empire
Sasanian Armenia
600s in the Sasanian Empire